is a velodrome located in Tokorozawa, Saitama that conducts pari-mutuel Keirin racing - one of Japan's four authorized  where gambling is permitted. Its Keirin identification number for betting purposes is 26# (26 sharp).

Seibu-en's oval is 400 meters in circumference. A typical keirin race of 2,025 meters consists of five laps around the course.

The Seibu Railway Seibu-en Station provides direct access to the velodrome.

External links
Seibu-en Keirin Home Page (Japanese)
keirin.jp Seibu-en Information (Japanese)

Velodromes in Japan
Cycle racing in Japan
Sports venues in Saitama Prefecture
Seibu Group
Buildings and structures in Tokorozawa, Saitama